California is the largest grower of peaches in the United States, producing about 70% of the total.

(Although the CFPA is a separate incorporation, it has always been operated by the CCPA's staff.) The overwhelming majority of the country's peaches are grown here,   for sales of $308.3 million. Since 1980 the total value of the harvest has been slightly increasing.

Economics
In 2014, California lead US peach production, followed by South Carolina, then Georgia. 

 cling deliveries for processing purposes have been on a downward trend for years.

Breeding of peach 
UCD hosts one of the major breeding programs in the country. Most of the private breeding programs for peach in the country are found in California, with a significant amount of the public breeding also being performed here but also elsewhere in the country.

Cultivars of peach 
UCANR recommends cultivars for the state:
 Autumn Flame
 Elegant Lady
 Sweet Dream
 July Flame
   Created here and has remained popular ever since.
 Brittney Lane
 Crimson Lady
 Rich Lady
 Spring Snow
 Summer Sweet
 Super Rich
 Zee Lady
 September Sun
 Snow Giant

Pests of peach 
See  for the cause of  here.

Arthropods in peach 
The most common insect pests are:
  (Brachycaudus persicae)
  (Bryobia rubrioculus)
  (Parthenolecanium corni)
  (Panonychus ulmi)
  (Archips argyrospila)
  (Tettigoniidae)
  (Choristoneura rosaceana)
  (Platynota stultana)
  (Grapholita molesta)
  (Chrysobothris mali)
  (Aculus cornutus)
  (Anarsia lineatella)
  (Synanthedon exitiosa)
  (Miridae) including:
 
 
 and 
  (Quadraspidiotus perniciosus)
  (Scolytus rugulosus)
  (Pentatomidae)
 :
 See 
 and 
 Western Flower Thrips (Frankliniella occidentalis), see

Diseaes of peach 
The most common unicellular diseases are:
 Armillaria Root Rot  see .
  (Pseudomonas syringae)
  (occasionally )
  (Agrobacterium tumefaciens)
  (M. fructicola, M. laxa, Sclerotinia sclerotiorum)
  (Taphrina deformans)
  (Phytophthora spp.)
  (Podosphaera leucotricha, Sphaerotheca pannosa)
  (B. cinerea, M. fructicola, Rhizopus spp.)
  (Tranzschelia discolor)
  (Cladosporium carpophilum)
  (Wilsonomyces carpophilus)
  (Verticillium dahliae)

(See also .)

Peach Yellow Leaf Roll was first discovered in the Sacramento Valley in 1948, but remained uncommon until an epidemic in the late 1970s and early 1980s. For the causative organism see .

Nematode diseases of peach 
The most common nematode diseases are:
 
  (Mesocriconema xenoplax syn. Criconemella xenoplax)
  (Pratylenchus vulnus and other Pratylenchus spp.)
  (Meloidogyne arenaria, and )

Weeds in peach 
The most common weeds are:
  (Hordeum leporinum)
  (Echinochloa crus-galli)
  (Cynodon dactylon)
  (Convolvulus arvensis)
  (Rubus spp.)
  (Poa annua)
  (Bromus tectorum)
  (B. diandrus)
  (Medicago polymorpha)
  (Phalaris spp.)
  (Stellaria media)
  (Trifolium spp.)
  (Digitaria spp.)
 s (Gnaphalium spp.)
  (Paspalum dilatatum)
  (Taraxacum officinale)
  (Rumex crispus)
  (Festuca spp.)
 s (Amsinckia spp.)
  (Erodium spp.)
 Hairy Fleabane, see 
  (Kickxia spp.)
  (Setaria spp.)
  (Chenopodium murale)
  (Senecio vulgaris)
  (Lamium amplexicaule)
 Marestail/Horseweed, see 
  (Sorghum halepense)
  (Echinochloa colona)
  (Polygonum arenastrum)
  (Chenopodium album)
  (Claytonia perfoliata)
  (Lactuca serriola)
  (Cheeseweed, Malva parviflora)
  (Brassica spp.)
  (Urtica urens)
  (Solanum spp.)
  (Cyperus rotundus)
  (Cyperus esculentus)
  (Avena fatua)
  (Oxalis spp.)
  (Amaranthus spp.)
  (Chamomilla suaveolens)
  (Plantago lanceolata)
  (Polypogon monspeliensis)
  (Tribulus terrestris)
  (Portulaca oleracea)
  (Raphanus raphanistrum)
  (Desert Rockpurslane, Calandrinia ciliata)
  (Sisymbrium irio)
  (Lolium spp.)
 s (Cenchrus spp.)
  (Capsella bursa-pastoris)
 s (Sonchus spp.)
 s (Leptochloa spp.)
  (Chamaesyce maculata)
  (Salsola tragus)
  (Epilobium brachycarpum)

Integrated pest management in peach 
Regional Integrated Pest Management Centers (Regional IPM Centers) hosts a suggested IPM plan for peach. UC IPM provides even more detailed integrated pest management information.

Fungal disease IPM in peach 
UC IPM recommends treatment timings and resistance management practices specifically for peach IPM.

References

Agriculture in California
Peach production